Jesper Mørkøv (born 11 March 1988) is a Danish male track and road cyclist, who last rode for UCI Continental team . He competed in the points race and madison events at the 2013 UCI Track Cycling World Championships. He is the brother of racing cyclists Jacob and Michael Mørkøv.

References

External links
 Profile at cyclingarchives.com

1988 births
Living people
Danish track cyclists
Danish male cyclists
People from Fredensborg Municipality
Sportspeople from the Capital Region of Denmark